Alíz Sarudi (born 12 February 1988) is a Hungarian sprint canoer and dragonboat racer.

Sarudi won the bronze medal at the 2011 ICF Canoe Sprint World Championships in the K-2 1000m event with her partner Erika Medveczky.

References

1988 births
Living people
People from Szolnok
Hungarian female canoeists
ICF Canoe Sprint World Championships medalists in kayak
Sportspeople from Jász-Nagykun-Szolnok County